Ottawa rules may refer to:

Ottawa knee rules, a set of rules used to determine whether an x-ray of the knee is needed
Ottawa ankle rules